Cylindrical perspective is a form of distortion caused by fisheye and panoramic lenses which reproduce straight horizontal lines above and below the lens axis level as curved while reproducing straight horizontal lines on lens axis level as straight. This is also a common feature of wide-angle anamorphic lenses of less than 40mm focal length in cinematography, as well as the basis for creating the 146-degree peripheral vision of Cinerama when projected into a matching, cylindrically curved screen.

See also 
 Distortion (optics)
 Stretch-o-Vision

Photographic techniques